524 Squadron or 524th Squadron may refer to:

 No. 524 Squadron RAF, United Kingdom
 524th Bomb Squadron, United States
 524th Fighter Squadron, United States
 524th Special Operations Squadron, United States